Clear Light is the only studio album by the American psychedelic rock band Clear Light, released in September 1967, by Elektra Records. The album was a moderate success.

Clear Light was released in September 1967 and peaked at number 126 on the Billboard pop albums chart. It combined elements of folk, rock, psychedelic, and classical music.  It is an AMG music pick. While the album was not a success at the time, it was considered as creative, coherent and competent. The album featured the unique characteristic of including two leading drummers on their tracks. The album also includes three tracks written by guitarist Bob Seal.

Recording
Recording commenced in April 1967 at Elektra Recording Studio in Los Angeles. The majority of the material was completed during these sessions, but the developments were postponed to replace Robbie Robison on guitar. Instead of a new guitarist, the band recruited keyboardist Ralph Schuckett, and, following a month of concerts, the band returned to recording in Sunset Sound Recorders Studios. The studios had just recently upgraded from a 4-track to an 8-track. A highlight of the recording sessions was the band's psychedelic interpretation of the Tom Paxton composition "Mr. Blue".

Release and reception

In his 1976 review for The Village Voice, Robert Christgau gave Clear Light a low rating of "D−" to an A+ to F scale. Matthew Greenwald of AllMusic was more positive to the record, calling it a "very good slice of Los Angeles psychedelia."

Track listing

The CD reissue of the album includes a bonus track, "She's Ready to Be Free", which was the B-side of the group's first single.

Personnel
Musicians

Cliff De Young – vocals
Bob Seal – guitar, vocals
Douglas Lubahn – bass
Ralph Schuckett – keyboards
Dallas Taylor – drums
Michael Ney – drums
Robbie Robison – guru
Lee Housekeeper – seer and overseer

Technical
Paul A. Rothchild – production
Bruce Botnick – engineer
Jac Holzman – production supervisor
Gordon Anderson – executive producer

References

External links
 Clear Light “Clear Light ” 1967 US West Coast Psych Rock. a psychedelic gem....!
 Album playlist at Youtube

1967 debut albums
Albums produced by Paul A. Rothchild
Elektra Records albums
Clear Light albums